The 2011 UEFA European Under-21 Championship started with a qualifying competition which began on 27 March 2009 and finished on 13 October 2010.  The final tournament was held in Denmark between 11–25 June 2011.

The first stage of the qualifying competition was a group stage followed by play-offs. Each of the 10 group winners, as well as the four highest ranked second place teams, advanced to the play-off. The play-offs determined which seven nations joined Denmark in the final tournament. Denmark, as hosts, qualified automatically.

Groups

Summary
Teams that secured a place in the play-offs are highlighted in green in their respective qualifying groups. The teams are ordered by final group position.

In case of equal points, the teams are ranked by their head-to-head record:
number of points
goal difference
goals scored
goals scored away from home.
If some teams have equal head-to-head record, then the following tiebreaks apply:
overall goal difference
overall goals scored
overall goals scored away from home
fair play conduct.

Group 1

Group 2

Group 3

Group 4

Group 5

Group 6

Group 7

Group 8

Group 9

Group 10

Ranking of second-placed teams
Since Groups 1 and 2 were composed of six teams, results against the 6th-ranked team were excluded.

Play-offs

The play-off first legs played on 9 October 2010, second legs played on 13 October 2010.

|}

Qualified teams

References

External links
Official site

 
UEFA European Under-21 Championship qualification
Qual
qualification